Knowing Me, Knowing You with Alan Partridge (also known as Knowing Me, Knowing You) is a BBC Television comedy series of six episodes (beginning 16 September 1994), and a Christmas special Knowing Me, Knowing Yule on 29 December 1995. It is named after the song "Knowing Me, Knowing You" by ABBA (the main character's favourite band), a rendition of which was used as the show's title music. Steve Coogan plays the incompetent but self-satisfied Norwich-based talk show host Alan Partridge, who often insults his guests and humiliates himself in the process. Alan was a spin-off character from the spoof radio show On the Hour (which later transferred to TV as The Day Today). Knowing Me, Knowing You was written by Coogan, Armando Iannucci (who produced the radio version) and Patrick Marber (who also starred), with contributions from the regular supporting cast of Doon Mackichan, Rebecca Front and David Schneider, who played Alan's weekly guests. Steve Brown provided the show's music and arrangements, and also appeared as Glenn Ponder, the man in charge of the house band (the name of which changed, without explanation, every episode).

Alan went on to appear in two series of the sitcom I'm Alan Partridge, following his life after both his marriage and TV career come to an end, though the latter was subsequently revived. It was generally well received by fans and critics, and was nominated for a BAFTA and a British Comedy Award.

Format 

Knowing Me, Knowing You is a parody of the 80's and 90's UK chat show, such as Wogan and Des O'Connor Tonight.

Reception 

The Austin Chronicle called it "one of the most hilarious satirical comedies in recent memory".

Episodes

References

External links

 Comedy Guide

1994 British television series debuts
1995 British television series endings
1990s British satirical television series
BBC television comedy
British parody television series
English-language television shows
Television series about television
Television series based on radio series
1990s British workplace comedy television series
Television series created by Armando Iannucci